Sid Robinson (December 6, 1902 – January 9, 1982) was an American middle-distance runner. He competed in the men's 1500 metres at the 1928 Summer Olympics.

References

External links
 

1902 births
1982 deaths
Athletes (track and field) at the 1928 Summer Olympics
American male middle-distance runners
Olympic track and field athletes of the United States
Track and field athletes from Mississippi
People from Winona, Mississippi